Rho Fiera railway station is a railway station in Italy. Located on the Turin–Milan railway, it serves the Fieramilano area in Rho. The station is located on Achille Grandi street. The train services are operated by Trenitalia and Trenord, and the station is one of the key nodes of the Milan suburban railway service.

Train services
The station is served by the following services:

Express services (Regionale Veloce) Turin - Chivasso – Vercelli – Novara – Milan
Milan Metropolitan services (S5) Varese - Rho - Milan - Treviglio
Milan Metropolitan services (S6) Novara - Rho - Milan - Treviglio
Milan Metropolitan services (S11) Rho - Milan - Monza - Seregno - Como - Chiasso

EXPO 2015
This was the most important railway station to reach EXPO. From Milan, the suburban services S5 and S6 as well as S14 (originating in Milano Rogoredo) of the suburban service, stopped at Rho Fiera train station, while passengers from Monza, Seregno, and Como could take line S11. Regional train services from Arona, Domodossola, Varese, and Turin had also stopped at Rho Fiera Milano train station.

See also
Milan suburban railway network

References

External links

Railway stations in Lombardy
Railway stations opened in 2008
Milan S Lines stations
2008 establishments in Italy
Rho
Railway stations in Italy opened in the 21st century